The African striped weasel (Poecilogale albinucha), the lone member of the genus Poecilogale, is a small, black and white weasel native to sub-Saharan Africa.

Description
The African striped weasel is one of the smallest mammalian carnivores in Africa, and has an elongated body and short legs. The fur is mostly black, with four white to pale yellowish bands running down the back, a white patch on the top of the head, and a white tail.

The head is elongated, with small eyes, a short, broad snout, and short ears. The carnassial teeth are short, and the canine teeth long. The claws are sharp and curved, and the tail is long and bushy. Females typically have four teats. Like many other mustelids, the African striped weasel has well-developed scent glands in the perineal region that can spray a noxious fluid when the animal feels threatened.

Distribution and habitat
African striped weasels inhabit much of Africa south of the equator. They are found from the Democratic Republic of the Congo across to Kenya in the north, and as far south as southern South Africa. Within this region, they are most common in savannah habitats, but may also be found in forests and grasslands.

Behaviour
African striped weasels are nocturnal hunters of small mammals, birds, and reptiles, but feed almost entirely on rodents of their own size or smaller. The weasels hunt primarily by scent, attacking prey with a sudden lunge and striking at the back of the neck. After the initial strike, they kill by whipping their own bodies and kicking, making use of their thin, lithe, muscular build to stun and tear the prey item. They sometimes store prey in their burrow instead of eating it immediately.

The weasel is generally solitary, but individuals sometimes pair up to dig burrows. They are effective diggers, but may sometimes rest in natural cavities such as hollow logs or rock crevices. They deposit dung in well-defined latrine locations, possibly as a means of scent marking. Males are aggressive when they encounter one another, at first fluffing their tails, making short cries and fake charges, and then escalating to fighting with bites, shaking, and aggressive shrieks if neither individual retreats.

African striped weasels have been identified as making six different calls. Apart from the warning and aggressive calls mentioned above, and a third call that transitions between the two, another call signals submission of a retreating male, another call indicates surrender during a fight, and a greeting call is used only between males and females and between young and their mother. Young weasels also make distress calls when separated from their mother.

Reproduction
Mating occurs between spring and summer, and includes at least three bouts of copulation, each lasting 60 to 80 minutes, in a single 24-hour period. Females give birth to a single litter of two or three young after a gestation period of 30 days.

The young are born in a burrow, and are initially blind and hairless, weighing just  each. Their canine teeth erupt at 5 weeks, and their eyes open after 7 weeks. By 11 weeks of age, they are weaned, and they start killing their own prey at 13 weeks. They reach the full adult size at 20 weeks, and are sexually mature at 8 months.

In folklore
According to African folklore, if one cuts off the nose of a weasel, it will grow back two shades lighter in colour, but it will bring misfortune to the family and lead to a poor harvest. This myth gave birth to expression, "A weasel's nose is not to be trifled with."

Diet 
African striped weasels mainly feed on mice and other small rodents. They also occasionally feed on birds and eggs.

References

 P. albinucha at Animal Diversity
 Nowak, Ronald M. (2005). Walker's Carnivores of the World. Baltimore: Johns Hopkins Press. 

Mammals described in 1864
Taxa named by John Edward Gray
Carnivorans of Africa
Fauna of East Africa
Mammals of Angola
Mammals of Botswana
Mammals of Kenya
Mammals of South Africa
Mammals of Tanzania
Mammals of the Democratic Republic of the Congo
Mammals of the Republic of the Congo
Mammals of Zambia
Ictonychinae